The Ringtone Countdown was a nationally-syndicated radio countdown show that counted down the top 10 biggest ringtones in the United States. Originating from Minneapolis-St. Paul, it was hosted by KDWB-FM Morning Show host Dave Ryan.

The Ringtone Countdown started in January 2008 and ended in December 2009. It was heard on Top 40/CHR stations nationwide. The show was produced and distributed by Nine-Ball Radio in the United States.

External links
 Ringtone Countdown Website

American music radio programs
Music chart shows
Mobile phone culture